A duster is a light, loose-fitting long coat.
The original dusters were full-length, light-colored canvas or linen coats worn by horsemen to protect their clothing from trail dust. These dusters were typically slit up the back to hip level for ease of wear on horseback. Dusters intended for riding may have features such as a buttonable rear slit and leg straps to hold the flaps in place.  For better protection against rain, dusters were made from oilcloth and later from waxed cotton.

In the late 19th and early 20th centuries, both men and women wore dusters to protect their clothes when riding in open motorcars on the dirt roads of the day.

Today

Western horsemen's dusters figured little in Western films until Sergio Leone re-introduced them in his movies The Good, the Bad, and the Ugly (1966) and Once Upon a Time in the West (1968). The latter played for many months in Paris and was in part credited with a revival of the duster in men's fashions in that city. Similarly, in the film genre of heroic bloodshed, primarily through Chow Yun Fat and John Woo, the hero is often seen wearing a duster. That is also true of the fictional anti-hero Omar Little, who wears dusters both as outerwear and as a silk sleepwear coverup in the HBO series, The Wire.

Dusters gained renewed popularity in the late 20th century and are now a standard item of Western wear. 
The Tenth Doctor played by David Tennant wore a cinnamon brown duster coat on Doctor Who.
Van Pelt, the main antagonist of Jumanji: Welcome to the Jungle wore a dark brown duster coat. Harry Dresden from Jim Butcher's Dresden Files wears a duster, as well as other cowboy-like attire. In the television comedy series "It's Always Sunny in Philadelphia", a black leather duster is featured in several episodes that is prized by several main characters, who often argue over who looks better wearing it.

In modern times, leather dusters are worn by motorcyclists to prevent road rash.

See also

Driza-Bone
J. Barbour & Sons
Trench coat

References

Sources

Safety clothing
History of clothing (Western fashion)
Western wear
Coats (clothing)
Western (genre) staples and terminology